Night Fishing may refer to:

Night Fishing (album), 2008 album of Japanese rock band Sakanaction
Night Fishing (film), 2011 South Korean short film